Pardaloberea curvaticeps is a species of beetle in the family Cerambycidae, and the only species in the genus Pardaloberea. It was described by Pic in 1926.

References

Saperdini
Beetles described in 1926